Dadhikot is a village and Village Development Committee in Bhaktapur District in the Bagmati Zone of central Nepal. At the time of the 1991 Nepal census it had a population of 5,818 with 1,031 houses indadhikot is popular with the help of bindhabasini temple it.

References

Populated places in Bhaktapur District